is a Japanese football player for FC Imabari.

Club statistics
Updated to 20 February 2017.

References

External links

Profile at FC Imabari

1988 births
Living people
University of Tsukuba alumni
People from Odawara
Association football people from Kanagawa Prefecture
Japanese footballers
J2 League players
Japan Football League players
Mito HollyHock players
FC Imabari players
Association football midfielders